Joseph Viskocil (December 21, 1952 – August 11, 2014) was an American special effects artist who had over 80 film credits from 1974 to 2014. He created special effects for some of the most famous movie franchises and was awarded an Academy Award for his work on Independence Day (1996).

Career
In 1977, Viskocil assisted John Dykstra and George Lucas in creating the pyrotechnics for Star Wars, including the explosion of the Death Star at the film's climax. In 1980, he returned to create pyrotechnics for The Empire Strikes Back. For the next three decades, he worked on films from the most famous franchises, including Ghostbusters, Batman and Star Trek.

After serving as pyrotechnics supervisor for the 1996 film Independence Day, Viskocil was awarded the Academy Award for Best Visual Effects alongside Volker Engel, Douglas Smith and Clay Pinney at the 69th Academy Awards. Viskocil and miniature supervisor Mike Joyce were responsible for the creation of a 15-feet wide and 5-feet high miniature of the White House, built for destruction during the film.

Style
In the 1990s, Viskocil opposed using computer-generated imagery in the creation of some special effects:

Following the September 11 attacks, Viskocil expressed guilt over making the explosions in Independence Day appear lifelike, saying "I started thinking maybe I did my job too well, and it might have been the nucleus of an idea for someone to say: ‘Hey, let’s crash a plane into the White House.’"

Personal life
Viskocil died on August 11, 2014, in Los Angeles from complications of liver and heart failure.

Filmography

Awards

References

External links

1952 births
2014 deaths
Best Visual Effects Academy Award winners
Special effects people
Academy Award for Technical Achievement winners